Sherko Faiqi (born 18 July 1999) is a Swedish footballer who last played as a midfielder for FC Linköping City.

Club career

IK Sirius
Sherko Faiqi made his Allsvenskan debut for Sirius on 5 November 2017 against AFC Eskilstuna.

International career

Youth
Faiqi has been called up to the Sweden national under-17 football team.

Career statistics

Club

References

External links 
 

1999 births
Living people
Swedish footballers
Iranian emigrants to Sweden
Sweden youth international footballers
Swedish people of Kurdish descent
Swedish people of Iranian descent
Sportspeople of Iranian descent
Kurdish sportspeople
Association football midfielders
IK Sirius Fotboll players
Nest-Sotra Fotball players
Gefle IF players
FC Linköping City players
Allsvenskan players
Norwegian First Division players
Ettan Fotboll players
Swedish expatriate footballers
Expatriate footballers in Norway
Swedish expatriate sportspeople in Norway